Raimo Epifanio Tesauro (–1511) was an Italian painter of the Renaissance period. He was born and died in Naples, was the son (or nephew) and pupil of Bernardo Tesauro. He painted several  works in fresco in the public buildings of Naples.

References

1480s births
1511 deaths
15th-century Neapolitan people
15th-century Italian painters
Italian male painters
16th-century Italian painters
Painters from Naples
Renaissance painters
Fresco painters
16th-century Neapolitan people